RMS Victorian was the world's first turbine-powered ocean liner. She was designed as a transatlantic liner and mail ship for Allan Line and launched in 1904.

Victorian was built in Belfast. She had a sister ship, Virginian, which was built in Scotland and launched four months later.

Throughout the First World War Victorian was an armed merchant cruiser (AMC). In 1918 she also carried cargo and troops.

In 1920 she returned to civilian service with the Canadian Pacific Steamship Company, but in 1921 the British Government chartered her as a troop ship. In 1922 Canadian Pacific renamed her Marloch. She was scrapped in 1929 after a quarter of a century of successful service.

Background
Charles Parsons had demonstrated the speed of his marine steam turbines in Turbinia launched in 1894 and their reliability in the Clyde excursion steamer  launched in 1901. But King Edwards fuel costs were higher than those of her reciprocating-engined and as a result so were her fares. Passengers accepted the higher cost on King Edwards day trips down the Clyde, but ocean liner companies did not know whether passengers, cargo customers and post offices would accept the higher cost on Atlantic crossings lasting several days.

Canadian Pacific entered the North Atlantic Trade by buying Elder Dempster Lines' Beaver Line subsidiary early in 1903. Allan Line responded by ordering a pair of new express liners. Allan Line originally planned to order conventional twin-screw ships with reciprocating steam engines, but in October 1903 it announced that it had ordered a pair of ships with turbines driving three screws as on King Edward.

On 28 January 1904, seven months before Victorian was launched, the Government of Canada announced it had awarded Allan Line a transatlantic mail contract. Four Allan Line ships were to provide a regular scheduled service: the  liners Bavarian and Tunisian, and the new Victorian and Virginian. The subsidy would be $5,000 per trip for Bavarian and Tunisian, and $10,000 per trip for each of the new turbine ships.

Design
Victorians propulsion system was a scaled-up version of King Edwards. She had three screws. Victorians Scotch marine boilers had coal-fired furnaces whose smoke was exhausted through a large single funnel. Exhaust steam from the high-pressure turbine drove the low-pressure Parsons turbines on her port and starboard (wing) shafts. All three screws were driven directly at turbine speed.

She had orlop decks fore and aft of her machinery spaces, and three full decks in her hull with berths for 240 second-class passengers on the main and upper deck and up to 940 in third class. Atop the hull, her forecastle was followed by forward holds, a long superstructure with cabins and public saloons for 470 first-class passengers on the bridge and promenade decks, an after hold, and a poop deck. Her holds had space for 8,000 tons of cargo and included refrigerated space for perishable produce.

Building and performance

Workman, Clark and Company built Victorian in Belfast, launching her on 25 August 1904. However, there were conflicting reports as to whether Victorians initial failure was caused by a shortcoming of her turbines or the design of her hull.

On 16 March it was reported that Victorian had achieved  on sea trials on the Firth of Clyde, with her turbines developing some 12,000 shaft horsepower and turning the screws at 260 RPM. She entered service a week later, and before the end of the year had set an eastbound record of five days and five hours from Rimouski in Quebec to Moville in Ireland, which stood for some time.

Allan Line service

On 23 March 1905 Victorian began her maiden voyage from Liverpool to Canada. Two days of bad weather prevented her from breaking any record, but she reached Halifax, Nova Scotia via Moville at noon on 1 April after a crossing of seven days and 22 hours. A fortnight later, on 6 April, her sister ship Virginian joined her on the route. The pair were a commercial success, and after some adjustments to her machinery, they maintained a regular transatlantic service between Britain, Ireland and Canada until August 1914.

On 1 September 1905 Victorian was reported to have run aground at Cape St. Charles, Labrador on an eastbound crossing, as dense smoke from forest fires had impaired navigation. She had  of water in her number two hold, her 350 passengers were taken off to continue their journey on Allan Line's  liner Bavarian a week later, and her mails were taken off and sent eastbound via New York.

On a westbound voyage on the morning of 11 August 1911, 57 of the stewards of Victorians first and second class dining saloons refused an instruction to help put ashore mail at Rimouski. The stewards later agreed to obey the instruction, but then refused to serve breakfast or lunch to the passengers. When Victorian reached Montreal that evening five Montreal Police vehicles met the ship and officers arrested all 57 stewards for mutiny. Allan Line suggested that the incident could be linked with the ongoing Liverpool transport strike that had begun on 14 June.

By 1912 Victorian was equipped for wireless telegraphy, operating on the 300 and 600 metre wavelengths. Her call sign was MVN.

When RMS Titanic sank on 15 April 1912 Victorian was about  astern of her, travelling in the same direction. Victorians wireless operator received news of the sinking "from  via ". The operator told Victorians Master, Captain Outram, but her passengers were not told until she reached Halifax. Outram said that Victorian had to divert "very far south" to avoid icebergs, and that his lookouts saw a great field of ice and 13 icebergs at one time.

First World War
On 28 July 1914 the First World War began. The British Admiralty had been converting passenger liners into AMCs since shortly before the war, and on 6 August listed eight more to be requisitioned, including Victorian. She was at Quebec that day and was detained accordingly. But she seems to have been allowed to proceed to Liverpool in civilian service, as she was requisitioned on 17 August, and was commissioned at Chatham Dockyard on 21 August. Initially her armament was eight 4.7-inch QF guns: two on her forecastle, two on her forward house, two on her after house and two on her poop deck. Her pennant number was M 56.

Victorian served with the 9th Cruiser Squadron from September 1914 until March 1915. In September 1914 she was ordered to the coast of Morocco, which France had invaded in 1907 and forced to become a French protectorate in 1912.

From October 1914 until January 1915 Victorian patrolled near the Canary Islands. She called at Freetown in Sierra Leone on 23–24 November. She patrolled the coast of Portugal in February, returned to home waters in March and was out of commission in April and May.

In June 1915 Cammell Laird replaced Victorians forecastle guns with two six-pounder guns that had been removed from HMS Caribbean, an RMSP liner that had briefly been an AMC but had then been deemed unsuitable. At about the same time Victorians other six 4.7-inch guns were replaced with six BL 6-inch and QF 6-inch naval guns. Also in June 1915 Victorian joined the 10th Cruiser Squadron.

With the 10th Cruiser Squadron Victorian was on the Northern Patrol from June 1915 until July 1917. Her patrols took her to the Norwegian Sea in 1915, around the Faroe Islands and the northern part of the Western Approaches in 1916 and the same plus the Icelandic coast of the Denmark Strait in the first half of 1917.

In May 1916 the two six-pounders were removed from her forecastle and replaced with a pair of anti-aircraft guns. By October 1916 her armament also included depth charges.

From August 1917 until November 1918 Victorian escorted convoys. In 1918 her pennant number was changed twice: to MI 91 in January and to MI 51 in April. From January 1918 she carried cargo and from April she carried troops, including US Army and Australian Army.

On 4 November 1918 Victorian arrived in the River Mersey to be decommissioned from the Royal Navy. Her guns were removed on 27 November and her unused ammunition was unloaded on 27–29 November.

Canadian Pacific service
Canadian Pacific had taken over Allan Line in 1917. Cammell, Laird refitted Victorian for civilian service, and on 13 April 1920 she resumed her old route between Liverpool, Quebec and Montreal.

In 1921 the UK government chartered Victorian as a troop ship to India. In 1922 the Fairfield Shipbuilding and Engineering Company converted her to oil-burning and replaced her original direct-drive turbines with new ones with single-reduction gearing, and Canadian Pacific renamed her Marloch.

In the mid-1920s Canadian Pacific put Marloch in reserve, but she often saw service.

On 26 June 1925 Marloch was in the Saint Lawrence River at Quebec when the tug Ocean King approached to receive a hawser and tow her. Ocean King crossed Marlochs bow too close and the liner rammed the tug. Ocean King capsized, the cold water of the river caused her boilers to explode, and all nine crew of the tug were killed.

On 3 February 1926 in fog in the Scheldt off Vlissingen, Marloch collided with the  UK cargo ship Whimbrel, which was holed on her starboard quarter and sank. Marloch was damaged and was towed to Southampton for repair.

On 19 September 1928 Marloch was laid up at Southend-on-Sea. On 17 April 1929 Canadian Pacific sold her to Thos. W. Ward Ltd, who scrapped her at either Milford Haven or Pembroke Dock.

References

Bibliography

External links
 

 

1904 ships
World War I Auxiliary cruisers of the Royal Navy
Maritime incidents in 1925
Maritime incidents in 1926
Ocean liners of the United Kingdom
Ships built in Belfast
Steamships of the United Kingdom
World War I cruisers of the United Kingdom